Bojan Mihajlović (born 15 September 1988) is a Bosnian-Herzegovinian football defender who plays for Sutjeska Foča.

External links
 Player profile at HLSZ 
 
 
 Bojan Mihajlović at FK Igman's website

1988 births
Living people
People from Foča
Serbs of Bosnia and Herzegovina
Bosnia and Herzegovina footballers
Association football central defenders
FK Sutjeska Foča players
FK Drina Zvornik players
Újpest FC players
FC Urartu players
FC Isloch Minsk Raion players
Maziya S&RC players
FK Igman Konjic players
NK GOŠK Gabela players
FK Goražde players
Premier League of Bosnia and Herzegovina players
Nemzeti Bajnokság II players
Nemzeti Bajnokság I players
Armenian Premier League players
Belarusian Premier League players
Dhivehi Premier League players
First League of the Federation of Bosnia and Herzegovina players
Bosnia and Herzegovina expatriate footballers
Expatriate footballers in Hungary
Expatriate footballers in Armenia
Expatriate footballers in Belarus
Expatriate footballers in the Maldives
Bosnia and Herzegovina expatriate sportspeople in Hungary
Bosnia and Herzegovina expatriate sportspeople in Belarus